Jim Whitely is a musician who in the late 1980s played bass guitar in several Birmingham-based hardcore and grindcore bands, most notably Napalm Death.

Biography
Jim Whitely was brought into Napalm Death in 1986 in hopes of restoring enthusiasm and dedication among the rest of the band, and to let bassist and singer Nik Bullen focus on singing. However, this plan failed, and after several concerts guitarist Justin Broadrick and then Bullen left the group. They were quickly replaced by Bill Steer on guitar and Lee Dorrian on vocals. While Whitely's tenure in Napalm Death lasted just about a year, during that time the band released its debut album Scum, on which he performed and wrote the lyrics for the second side (the first side was recorded before he joined). During this time Whitely also played bass for Doom on some studio sessions.

After touring to support Scum, Whitely left to join the more established and successful (at the time) hardcore band Ripcord. During his time in Ripcord, the band played a Your Choice Records show and recorded their second album, Poetic Justice. This was short-lived, as Ripcord disbanded by 1989.
In 2004, Whitley reunited with Napalm Death to record bass for two tracks on their cover album Leaders Not Followers: Part 2: Discharge's "War's No Fairytale", and Anti Cimex's "Game of Arseholes".

Discography

Napalm Death
 Scum (1987)
 Leaders Not Followers: Part 2 (2004)

Doom
 A Vile Peace (1987)

Ripcord
 Your Choice Live Series (1988)
 Harvest Hardcore (1988)
 Poetic Justice (1988)

References

External links
 Discogs Page
 Kill from the Heart page on Ripcord

Napalm Death members
English punk rock bass guitarists
English heavy metal bass guitarists
Male bass guitarists
Living people
Year of birth missing (living people)
Grindcore musicians
Hardcore punk musicians